"Freedom" is a hit song by British pop duo Wham!. It became the group's second number one hit on the UK Singles Chart and reached number three in America. It was written and produced by George Michael, one half of the duo.

History
Cash Box said that "George Michael’s R&B tinged vocals soar with the tune’s catchy refrain." Billboard described the song as a "Motown tribute".

Wham! had already enjoyed a successful 1984 by the time "Freedom" was released in October of the year. "Wake Me Up Before You Go-Go" had given them their first UK number one and had then reached the top of the Billboard Hot 100 in the United States. George had then gone to number one with a solo single, "Careless Whisper". 

"Freedom" was number one in the UK for three weeks, and featured on the album Make It Big, which was issued at the same time. "Freedom" was the 10th biggest-selling single of 1984. This song also reached number 3 on the Billboard Hot 100 in the US in September 1985. The music video, coinciding with the 1985 US release, features the band touring around Beijing, China.

The melody of the song's chorus was used by George Michael as an introduction to his song, "Faith", played on a church organ.

A reworked version of the song with altered lyrics (but still performed by the duo) was used to promote Maxell's line of audio cassettes in 1984.

When the single was released in the United States, the song was remixed and extended an extra 20 seconds. The remix involved the vocals being given more reverb and the organ sounds being higher up in the mix. The extension involved a new trumpet section and added vocals. The section had first been heard in The Big Tour to close the number.

The American remix was later included on The Final (album) and later, the greatest hits compilation album The Best of Wham!: If You Were There.... However, the original version was included on the release of Make It Big in the United States.

Track listings

 Incorrectly labelled as 5:00 in length.

 Note "Long Version" is mislabeled as "Long Mix"

Charts

Weekly charts

Year-end charts

Certifications

References

UK Singles Chart number-one singles
Irish Singles Chart number-one singles
Wham! songs
1984 singles
Number-one singles in Iceland
Number-one singles in Norway
Songs about casual sex
Songs written by George Michael
Song recordings produced by George Michael
1984 songs
CBS Records singles